The Association of Former Members of Parliament is a British organisation for former members of the House of Commons of the United Kingdom founded in 2003.

It produces a magazine called Order! Order! and has an office in the House of Commons. It has members of all political parties including both John Major and Tony Blair.

In 2007 it commissioned research on "the challenges former parliamentarians can face in navigating the world of work".

References

Organisations based in London